The North Metropolitan Province was a two-member electoral province of the Western Australian Legislative Council, located in metropolitan Perth. It was one of several metropolitan seats created following the enactment of the Constitution Acts Amendment Act (No.2) 1963, and became effective on 22 May 1965. At each election, held every three years, one of the two seats was vacated, and the trend in North Metropolitan reflected statewide trends and swings rather than being safe for either of the major parties.

In 1989, the province was abolished by the Acts Amendment (Electoral Reform) Act 1987, and with two others became part of the North Metropolitan Region under the new proportional voting system.

Geography
The province was made up of several complete Legislative Assembly districts, which changed at each distribution.

Representation

Members

References
 

Former electoral provinces of Western Australia